Imogene Goodshot Arquero is an Oglala Lakota beadwork artist from South Dakota, who lives in Santa Fe, New Mexico.

Personal 
Imogene Jessie Goodshot Arquero is the great-great-granddaughter of the Oglala Lakota war chief, Crazy Horse (ca. 1840–1877). She is married to painter Dominic Arquero (Cochiti Pueblo).

Art career 
Imogene Arquero is known for her beadwork, in which she combines historic techniques with forms from mainstream culture such as tennis shoes and baseball caps. She began her career as beadwork artist, working in classical Northern Plains styles before experimenting with new forms.

The artist taught "Traditional Techniques" at the Institute of American Indian Arts in Santa Fe in the 1970s.

Arquero participated in Women of Sweetgrass, Cedar and Sage, a 1985 traveling exhibition of contemporary Native women artists curated by Harmony Hammond and Jaune Quick-to-See Smith. She has also exhibited in Santa Fe Indian Market.

Public collections 
Arquero's work is held by the Fenimore Art Museum, among other institutions.

References

Living people
Native American women artists
Native American bead artists
Women beadworkers
Artists from South Dakota
Artists from Santa Fe, New Mexico
20th-century American artists
20th-century American women artists
21st-century American artists
21st-century American women artists
Institute of American Indian Arts faculty
Oglala people
Year of birth missing (living people)
American women academics
20th-century Native American women
20th-century Native Americans
21st-century Native American women
21st-century Native Americans